Yacht of the Seven Sins (German: Die Yacht der sieben Sünden) is a 1928 German silent drama film directed by Jacob Fleck and Luise Fleck and starring Brigitte Helm, John Stuart and  Rina Marsa.

The film's art direction was by Jacek Rotmil.

Synopsis
A number of millionaires and criminals gather aboard a luxury cruise liner for a round-the-world trip, but a shipping tycoon is murdered soon after departure.

Cast
 Brigitte Helm as Marfa Petrowna  
 John Stuart as Kilian Gurlitt  
 Rina Marsa as Léonie Storm, seine Braut  
 Kurt Vespermann as Alfons Costa  
 Hugo Werner-Kahle as Der Fremde  
 Kurt Gerron as Der Mann mit der Narbe  
 Alfred Gerasch as Stefan Martini  
 Emil Rameau as Bürovorsteher  
 Otto Kronburger as Kommissar 
 Nico Turoff

References

Bibliography
 Ganeva, Mila. Women in Weimar Fashion: Discourses and Displays in German Culture, 1918-1933. Camden House, 2008.

External links

1928 films
Films of the Weimar Republic
Films directed by Jacob Fleck
Films directed by Luise Fleck
German silent feature films
UFA GmbH films
Seafaring films
German black-and-white films
German drama films
1928 drama films
Silent drama films
Silent adventure films
1920s German films